The Honda WR-V is a subcompact crossover SUV manufactured by Honda since 2017 and mainly sold for emerging markets. It is positioned below the HR-V/Vezel or the BR-V depending on the market where it is sold. For the first generation, it was a crossover-styled derivative of the third-generation Fit/Jazz with different front fascia and bonnet treatments. Introduced at the 2016 São Paulo International Motor Show, the first-generation WR-V was built and specifically sold for the South American and Indian market. The second-generation model introduced in Indonesia in 2022 is based on the shortened second-generation BR-V's platform (also shared with the second-generation Amaze).

According to Honda, the name WR-V stands for Winsome Roundabout Vehicle.



First generation (GL; 2017)

Overview 
The first-generation WR-V was launched in Brazil on 15 March 2017 and India on 16 March. It was the first model developed by Honda Research & Development Center of Brazil in collaboration with Honda Research & Development Center of Japan, while keeping the requirements and preferences of the young Brazilian and Indian customers in mind. According to Honda, the WR-V "is endowed with a sporty, stylish and aggressive design language".

The first-generation WR-V shared many of its parts and features with the Fit/Jazz, including the body shell, doors, dashboard and the instrument panel.

The model received a facelift in 2020, first launched in India and then in South America.

In 2022, sales ended in Brazil. Production continued for export.

Powertrains 
In India, the first-generation WR-V was available in both petrol and diesel engine options that were shared with the Jazz. In Brazil, it was powered by a larger 1.5-litre L15A7 i-VTEC four-cylinder petrol engine that was also shared with the Fit.

Gallery

Safety 
The first-generation WR-V in its most basic Latin American configuration with 2 airbags, UN127 pedestrian safety standard and ESC received a 1-star safety rating from Latin NCAP in 2022 (similar to 2014 Euro NCAP rating systems).

Second generation (DG4; 2022)

Overview 
The second-generation WR-V was launched in Indonesia on 2 November 2022. It was initially previewed by the  concept car showcased at the 28th Gaikindo Indonesia International Auto Show on 11 November 2021. Its camouflaged production form was later showcased at the 29th iteration of the show on 11 August 2022.

The model shared the outer headlight assembly, bonnet and front door panels with the second-generation Amaze.

Exports from Indonesia commenced on 28 February 2023.

Powertrains 
There is no diesel engine option for this generation.

Markets

Indonesia 
In Indonesia, the second-generation WR-V is offered in E and RS grade levels, both only available with CVT. Honda Sensing active safety system along with the LaneWatch camera system is available as an option for the RS grade.

Thailand 
The second-generation WR-V was launched on 10 March 2023 in Thailand. Imported from Indonesia, it is offered in SV and RS grade levels with CVT and Honda Sensing as standard.

Safety

Sales

References

External links 

  (India)
  (Indonesia)

WR-V
Cars introduced in 2017
2020s cars
Mini sport utility vehicles
Crossover sport utility vehicles
Front-wheel-drive vehicles
Vehicles with CVT transmission